ChuChu was a Japanese shōjo manga magazine published by Shogakukan for 11–14-year-old girls. ChuChu became a monthly magazine in December 2005. On October 26, 2009, Shogakukan announced that it canceled ChuChu. It ended on December 28, 2009.

Manga artists and series featured in ChuChu

 Kiyoko Arai
Yomogi Mochi Yake Ta?
 Nimi Fujita
Choco to Mint to'''
 Kirara Himekawa
 Natsumi Kawahara
 Naoto Kohaku
 Yukino MiyawakiNG Boy x Paradice Aqua MizutoALMIGHTY x 10 Kaya NanashimaMakimodoshi no Koi no Uta Miyuki OhbayashiSakura Zensen Kei Ouri
 Takemaru SasamiItako Chan Doki Doki Zukins Mikiko SatsukiKoi Pazzle Miwako SugiyamaRoyal Green Mitsuboshi Love Days Naomi UramotoNattoku Ponchi Tae UsamiOtome no Heart mo Kane Shidai Yuu Yabuchi
 Anicon Hitohira no Koi ga Furu''

References

2005 establishments in Japan
2009 disestablishments in Japan
Defunct magazines published in Japan
Magazines established in 2005
Magazines disestablished in 2009
Magazines published in Tokyo
Monthly manga magazines published in Japan
Shōjo manga magazines
Shogakukan magazines